In combinatorics, the Eulerian number A(n, m) is the number of permutations of the numbers 1 to n in which exactly m elements are greater than the previous element (permutations with m "ascents"). They are the coefficients of the Eulerian polynomials:

The Eulerian polynomials are defined by the exponential generating function

 

The Eulerian polynomials can be computed by the recurrence

 

An equivalent way to write this definition is to set the Eulerian polynomials inductively by

 

History

(see the facsimile). These polynomials are a shifted form of what are now called the Eulerian polynomials An(x).

Basic properties
For a given value of n > 0, the index m in A(n, m) can take values from 0 to n − 1. For fixed n there is a single permutation which has 0 ascents: (n, n − 1, n − 2, ..., 1). There is also a single permutation which has n − 1 ascents; this is the rising permutation (1, 2, 3, ..., n). Therefore A(n, 0) and A(n, n − 1) are 1 for all values of n.

Reversing a permutation with m ascents creates another permutation in which there are n − m − 1 ascents.
Therefore A(n, m) = A(n, n − m − 1).

Values of A(n, m) can be calculated "by hand" for small values of n and m. For example

{| class="wikitable"
|-
! n
! m
! Permutations
! A(n, m)
|-
| 1
| 0
| (1)
| A(1,0) = 1
|-
|rowspan="2" | 2
| 0
| (2, 1)
| A(2,0) = 1
|-
| 1
| (1, 2)
| A(2,1) = 1
|-
|rowspan="3" | 3
| 0
| (3, 2, 1)
| A(3,0) = 1
|-
| 1
| (1, 3, 2) (2, 1, 3) (2, 3, 1) (3, 1, 2)
| A(3,1) = 4
|-
| 2
| (1, 2, 3)
| A(3,2) = 1
|}

For larger values of n, A(n, m) can be calculated using the recursive formula

For example

Values of A(n, m)  for 0 ≤ n ≤ 9 are:

{| class="wikitable" style="text-align:right;"
|-
! 
! width="50" | 0
! width="50" | 1
! width="50" | 2
! width="50" | 3
! width="50" | 4
! width="50" | 5
! width="50" | 6
! width="50" | 7
! width="50" | 8
|-
! 1
| 1 || || || || || || || ||
|-
! 2
| 1 || 1 || || || || || || ||
|-
! 3
| 1 || 4 || 1 || || || || || ||
|-
! 4
| 1 || 11 || 11 || 1 || || || || ||
|-
! 5
| 1 || 26 || 66 || 26 || 1 || || || ||
|-
! 6
| 1 || 57 || 302 || 302 || 57 || 1 || || ||
|-
! 7
| 1 || 120 || 1191 || 2416 || 1191 || 120 || 1 || ||
|-
! 8
| 1 || 247 || 4293 || 15619 || 15619 || 4293 || 247 || 1 ||
|-
! 9
| 1 || 502 || 14608 || 88234 || 156190 || 88234 || 14608 || 502 || 1
|}

The above triangular array is called the Euler triangle or Euler's triangle, and it shares some common characteristics with Pascal's triangle. The sum of row n is the factorial n!.

Explicit formula
An explicit formula for A(n, m) is

Summation properties
It is clear from the combinatorial definition that the sum of the Eulerian numbers for a fixed value of n is the total number of permutations of the numbers 1 to n, so

The alternating sum of the Eulerian numbers for a fixed value of n is related to the Bernoulli number Bn+1

Other summation properties of the Eulerian numbers are:

where Bn is the nth Bernoulli number.

Identities
The Eulerian numbers are involved in the generating function for the sequence of nth powers:

This assumes that 00 = 0 and A(0,0) = 1 (since there is one permutation of no elements, and it has no ascents).

Worpitzky's identity expresses xn as the linear combination of Eulerian numbers with binomial coefficients:

It follows from Worpitzky's identity that 

Another interesting identity is

The numerator on the right-hand side is the  Eulerian polynomial.

For a fixed function  which is integrable on  we have the integral formula

Eulerian numbers of the second order
The permutations of the multiset {1, 1, 2, 2, ···, n, n} which have the property that for each k, all the numbers appearing between the two occurrences of k in the permutation are greater than k are counted by the double factorial number (2n−1)!!. 
The Eulerian number of the second order, denoted , counts the number of all such  permutations  that have exactly m ascents. For instance, for n = 3 there are 15 such permutations, 1 with no ascents, 8 with a single ascent, and 6 with two ascents:

 332211, 
 221133, 221331, 223311, 233211, 113322, 133221, 331122, 331221,  
 112233, 122133, 112332, 123321, 133122, 122331. 

The Eulerian numbers of the second order satisfy the recurrence relation, that follows directly from the above definition:

with initial condition for n = 0, expressed in Iverson bracket notation:

Correspondingly, the Eulerian polynomial of second order, here denoted Pn (no standard notation exists for them) are

and the above recurrence relations are translated into a recurrence relation for the sequence Pn(x):

with initial condition

The latter recurrence may be written in a somehow more compact form by means of an integrating factor:

so that the rational function

satisfies a simple autonomous recurrence:

whence one obtains the Eulerian polynomials of second order as Pn(x) = (1−x)2n un(x), and the Eulerian numbers of second order as their coefficients.

Here are some values of the second order Eulerian numbers:

{| class="wikitable" style="text-align:right;"
|-
! 
! width="50" | 0
! width="50" | 1
! width="50" | 2
! width="50" | 3
! width="50" | 4
! width="50" | 5
! width="50" | 6
! width="50" | 7
! width="50" | 8
|-
! 1
| 1 || || || || || || || ||
|-
! 2
| 1 || 2 || || || || || || ||
|-
! 3
| 1 || 8 || 6 || || || || || ||
|-
! 4
| 1 || 22 || 58 || 24 || || || || ||
|-
! 5
| 1 || 52 || 328 || 444 || 120 || || || ||
|-
! 6
| 1 || 114 || 1452 || 4400 || 3708 || 720 || || ||
|-
! 7
| 1 || 240 || 5610 || 32120 || 58140 || 33984 || 5040 || ||
|-
! 8
| 1 || 494 || 19950 || 195800 || 644020 || 785304 || 341136 || 40320 ||
|-
! 9
| 1 || 1004 || 67260 || 1062500 || 5765500 || 12440064 || 11026296 || 3733920 || 362880
|}
The sum of the n-th row, which is also the value Pn(1), is (2n − 1)!!.

References
 Eulerus, Leonardus [Leonhard Euler] (1755). Institutiones calculi differentialis cum eius usu in analysi finitorum ac doctrina serierum [Foundations of differential calculus, with applications to finite analysis and series]. Academia imperialis scientiarum Petropolitana; Berolini: Officina Michaelis.

Citations

External links
Eulerian Polynomials at OEIS Wiki. 
 

Euler-matrix (generalized rowindexes, divergent summation)

Enumerative combinatorics
Factorial and binomial topics
Integer sequences
Triangles of numbers